Île-de-France tramway Line 10 (usually called simply T10 and formerly known as Tramway Antony - Clamart or TAC) is a future suburban tram line which is a part of the modern tram network of the Île-de-France region of France. Line T10 will connect  Paris RER station and Clamart serving suburbs in the south-west of Paris. The line will open 13 stations to the public in mid-2023, with a final section to Clamart to be open at a later date.

The entire line is expected to be accessible, with all stations equipped with ramps for people with reduced mobility and strollers. The stations are also well-equipped, with information panels showing waiting times, automatic ticket dispensers and video surveillance systems.

The tram is expected to be 100% electric, with each car having 70 seats and capable of carrying up to 300 people. The cars are also expected to be equipped with air conditioning and USB charging stations.

Route

Notes and references 

Line 10